David A. Rothery is professor of planetary geosciences at the Open University, where he chairs a level 2 module Planetary Science and the Search for Life and a level 1 module Volcanoes, Earthquakes and Tsunamis. He serves on the Open University's Senate.

From 1999 to 2004 he worked on the Beagle2 project led by Colin Pillinger. In 2006 he was appointed U.K. lead scientist for the MIXS (Mercury Imaging X-ray Spectrometer) on the joint European Space Agency/JAXA mission to Mercury named BepiColombo. He leads the European Space Agency's Mercury Surface & Composition Working Group in preparation for the BepiColombo mission, which was successfully launched on 20 October 2018.
He has been a guest several times on The Sky at Night, and is frequently featured or quoted in TV, radio, print and online news stories about planetary science, volcanic eruptions, earthquakes and tsunamis.

Education
Rothery graduated with a degree in Geology from the University of Cambridge (Churchill College) in 1978, and completed his PhD in 1982 on applications of remote sensing in the Semail Ophiolite in Oman.

Publications
 Moons: A Very Short Introduction
 Planets: A Very Short Introduction
 Planet Mercury: From Pale Pink Dot to Dynamic World.
 Volcanoes, Earthquakes and Tsunamis: A Complete Introduction
 Geology: A Complete Introduction
 Satellites of the Outer Planets: Worlds in Their Own Right

References

Living people
Year of birth missing (living people)
Planetary scientists
Academics of the Open University
British volcanologists
British science writers